Birch River is a census-designated place (CDP) in northern Nicholas County, West Virginia, United States. The community is situated in the valley of the Birch River and is the location of the western terminus of West Virginia Route 82, at U.S. Route 19. As of the 2010 census, its population was 107.

References

Census-designated places in Nicholas County, West Virginia
Census-designated places in West Virginia